Los Gomeros Airport,  is an airport  north of Rengo, a city in the O'Higgins Region of Chile.

See also

Transport in Chile
List of airports in Chile

References

External links
OpenStreetMap - Los Gomeros
OurAirports - Los Gomeros
FallingRain - Los Gomeros Airport

Airports in Chile
Airports in O'Higgins Region